"Bangamata" (English: "Mother Bengal") is a 14-line Bengali poem written by Rabindranath Tagore as part of his 1896 poetry book Chaitali.

Background 
Tagore wrote the poem "Bangamata" during the British Raj period in India, during which he perceived the Bengali's cultural heritage being erased. Unsatisfied with British rule, he wanted to encourage fellow Bengalis to perform national duties for Bengal.

Transliteration

Present day 
Tagore's Bangamata has seen a resurgence in popularity among groups wishing to preserve Bengali culture.

References

External links 
 rabindra-rachanabali.nltr.org
Bangamata poem (in Bengali)

Poems by Rabindranath Tagore
Bengali-language poems
Poems